Graham's number is an immense number that arose as an upper bound on the answer of a problem in the mathematical field of Ramsey theory. It is much larger than many other large numbers such as Skewes's number and Moser's number, both of which are in turn much larger than a googolplex. As with these, it is so large that the observable universe is far too small to contain an ordinary digital representation of Graham's number, assuming that each digit occupies one Planck volume, possibly the smallest measurable space. But even the number of digits in this digital representation of Graham's number would itself be a number so large that its digital representation cannot be represented in the observable universe. Nor even can the number of digits of that number—and so forth, for a number of times far exceeding the total number of Planck volumes in the observable universe. Thus Graham's number cannot be expressed even by physical universe-scale power towers of the form .

However, Graham's number can be explicitly given by computable recursive formulas using Knuth's up-arrow notation or equivalent, as was done by Ronald Graham, the number's namesake. As there is a recursive formula to define it, it is much smaller than typical busy beaver numbers. Though too large to be computed in full, the sequence of digits of Graham's number can be computed explicitly via simple algorithms; the last 13 digits are ...7262464195387.

Graham's number was used by Graham in conversations with popular science writer Martin Gardner as a simplified explanation of the upper bounds of the problem he was working on. In 1977, Gardner described the number in Scientific American, introducing it to the general public.  At the time of its introduction, it was the largest specific positive integer ever to have been used in a published mathematical proof.  The number was described in the 1980 Guinness Book of World Records, adding to its popular interest.  Other specific integers (such as TREE(3)) known to be far larger than Graham's number have since appeared in many serious mathematical proofs, for example in connection with Harvey Friedman's various finite forms of Kruskal's theorem. Additionally, smaller upper bounds on the Ramsey theory problem from which Graham's number derived have since been proven to be valid.

Context

Graham's number is connected to the following problem in Ramsey theory:

In 1971, Graham and Rothschild proved the Graham–Rothschild theorem on the Ramsey theory of parameter words, a special case of which shows that this problem has a solution N*. They bounded the value of N* by 6 ≤ N* ≤ N, with N being a large but explicitly defined number

where  in Knuth's up-arrow notation; the number is between 4 → 2 → 8 → 2 and 2 → 3 → 9 → 2 in Conway chained arrow notation. This was reduced in 2014 via upper bounds on the Hales–Jewett number to

which contains three tetrations. In 2019 this was further improved to:

 

The lower bound of 6 was later improved to 11 by Geoffrey Exoo in 2003, and to 13 by Jerome Barkley in 2008.

Graham's number, G, is much larger than N: , where . This weaker upper bound for the problem, attributed to an unpublished work of Graham, was eventually published and named by Martin Gardner in Scientific American in November 1977.

Publication
The number gained a degree of popular attention when Martin Gardner described it in the "Mathematical Games" section of Scientific American in November 1977, writing that Graham had recently established, in an unpublished proof, "a bound so vast that it holds the record for the largest number ever used in a serious mathematical proof." The 1980 Guinness Book of World Records repeated Gardner's claim, adding to the popular interest in this number. According to physicist John Baez, Graham invented the quantity now known as Graham's number in conversation with Gardner. While Graham was trying to explain a result in Ramsey theory which he had derived with his collaborator Bruce Lee Rothschild, Graham found that the said quantity was easier to explain than the actual number appearing in the proof. Because the number which Graham described to Gardner is larger than the number in the paper itself, both are valid upper bounds for the solution to the problem studied by Graham and Rothschild.

Definition
Using Knuth's up-arrow notation, Graham's number G (as defined in Gardner's Scientific American article) is

where the number of arrows in each layer is specified by the value of the next layer below it; that is,

 where   

and where a superscript on an up-arrow indicates how many arrows there are. In other words, G is calculated in 64 steps: the first step is to calculate g1 with four up-arrows between 3s; the second step is to calculate g2 with g1 up-arrows between 3s; the third step is to calculate g3 with g2 up-arrows between 3s; and so on, until finally calculating G = g64 with g63 up-arrows between 3s.

Equivalently,

and the superscript on f indicates an iteration of the function, e.g., . Expressed in terms of the family of hyperoperations , the function f is the particular sequence , which is a version of the rapidly growing Ackermann function A(n, n). (In fact,  for all n.)

Magnitude
To convey the difficulty of appreciating the enormous size of Graham's number, it may be helpful to express—in terms of exponentiation alone—just the first term (g1) of the rapidly growing 64-term sequence.  First, in terms of tetration alone:

where the number of 3s in the expression on the right is

Now each tetration operation reduces to a power tower according to the definition
 where there are X 3s.

Thus,

becomes, solely in terms of repeated "exponentiation towers",

and where the number of 3s in each tower, starting from the leftmost tower, is specified by the value of the next tower to the right.

In other words, g1 is computed by first calculating the number of towers,  (where the number of 3s is ), and then computing the nth tower in the following sequence:

       1st tower:  3
      
       2nd tower:  3↑3↑3 (number of 3s is 3) = 7625597484987
      
       3rd tower:  3↑3↑3↑3↑...↑3 (number of 3s is 7625597484987) = …
      
       ⋮
      
  g1 = nth tower:  3↑3↑3↑3↑3↑3↑3↑...↑3 (number of 3s is given by the n-1th tower)
where the number of 3s in each successive tower is given by the tower just before it.  Note that the result of calculating the third tower is the value of n, the number of towers for g1.

The magnitude of this first term, g1, is so large that it is practically incomprehensible, even though the above display is relatively easy to comprehend. Even n, the mere number of towers in this formula for g1, is far greater than the number of Planck volumes (roughly 10185 of them) into which one can imagine subdividing the observable universe. And after this first term, still another 63 terms remain in the rapidly growing g sequence before Graham's number G = g64 is reached.

Rightmost decimal digits
Graham's number is a "power tower" of the form 3↑↑n (with a very large value of n), so its rightmost decimal digits must satisfy certain properties common to all such towers.  One of these properties is that all such towers of height greater than d (say), have the same sequence of d rightmost decimal digits. This is a special case of a more general property: The d rightmost decimal digits of all such towers of height greater than d+2, are independent of the topmost "3" in the tower; i.e., the topmost "3" can be changed to any other non-negative integer without affecting the d rightmost digits.

The following table illustrates, for a few values of d, how this happens.  For a given height of tower and number of digits d, the full range of d-digit numbers (10d of them) does not occur; instead, a certain smaller subset of values repeats itself in a cycle.  The length of the cycle and some of the values (in parentheses) are shown in each cell of this table:

The particular rightmost d digits that are ultimately shared by all sufficiently tall towers of 3s are in bold text, and can be seen developing as the tower height increases.  For any fixed number of digits d (row in the table), the number of values possible for 33↑…3↑x mod 10d, as x ranges over all nonnegative integers, is seen to decrease steadily as the height increases, until eventually reducing the "possibility set" to a single number (colored cells) when the height exceeds d+2.

A simple algorithm for computing these digits may be described as follows: let x = 3, then iterate, d times, the assignment x = 3x mod 10d. Except for omitting any leading 0s, the final value assigned to x (as a base-ten numeral) is then composed of the d rightmost decimal digits of 3↑↑n, for all n > d.  (If the final value of x has fewer than d digits, then the required number of leading 0s must be added.)

Let k be the numerousness of these stable digits, which satisfy the congruence relation G(mod 10k)≡[GG](mod 10k).

k=t-1, where G(t):=3↑↑t. It follows that, .

The algorithm above produces the following 500 rightmost decimal digits of Graham's number:

 ...02425950695064738395657479136519351798334535362521
    43003540126026771622672160419810652263169355188780
    38814483140652526168785095552646051071172000997092
    91249544378887496062882911725063001303622934916080
    25459461494578871427832350829242102091825896753560
    43086993801689249889268099510169055919951195027887
    17830837018340236474548882222161573228010132974509
    27344594504343300901096928025352751833289884461508
    94042482650181938515625357963996189939679054966380
    03222348723967018485186439059104575627262464195387

References

Bibliography
 ; reprinted (revised) in Gardner (2001), cited below.
 
 
  The explicit formula for N appears on p. 290. This is not the "Graham's number" G published by Martin Gardner.
 On p. 90, in stating "the best available estimate" for the solution, the explicit formula for N is repeated from the 1971 paper.

External links
 
 Sbiis Saibian's article on Graham's number
 "A Ramsey Problem on Hypercubes" by Geoff Exoo
 Mathworld article on Graham's number
 How to calculate Graham's number
 Conceptualizing Graham's number 
 Some Ramsey results for the n-cube prepublication mentions Graham's number
 
 Archived at Ghostarchive and the Wayback Machine: 
 Archived at Ghostarchive and the Wayback Machine: 
 The last 16 million digits of Graham's number by the Darkside communication group

Ramsey theory
Integers
Large integers